The Team large hill event of the FIS Nordic World Ski Championships 2017 was held on 4 March 2017.

Results
The first round was started at 17:15 and the second round at 18:25.

References

Team large hill